John Francis Coates, OBE (30 March 1922 – 10 July 2010) was a British naval architect best known for his work on the study of construction of the Ancient Greek trireme. His research led to the construction of the first working replica of triremes, the fastest and most devastating warship of Classical Mediterranean empires, and gave a greater understanding of how they were built and used. He also carried out research into the use of shipping in Northern Europe during the Bronze Age, in particular the Ferriby Bronze Age boat and the Dover Boat.

Career
Coates was born and raised in Swansea, the son of chemists Ada and Joseph E. Coates, Professor of Chemistry at the University College of Swansea. He was educated at Clifton College and took Engineering Science at The Queen's College, Oxford.  He joined the Royal Corps of Naval Constructors and in 1943 saw sea service on the Arctic convoys.  After the war, he continued to work in the Admiralty.  An early project was the design of new inflatable life jackets and life rafts for which he was appointed OBE in 1955.  He was the leading ship design architect for the County-class destroyers. Coates remained in Admiralty service until 1979 when he retired from the post of Chief Naval Architect.

Trireme Reconstruction

In 1982 he was approached by Professor John Morrison of Wolfson College, Cambridge to assist with research into the design of the trireme. Together they and others founded the Trireme Trust, and created a series of scale models and a full scale cross section based on historical records, archaeological evidence and the science of naval architecture. Coates developed a complete design, encompassing more than 40 sheets of plans and 100 pages of specifications, which enabled the construction of a full-scale replica, the Olympias, funded by the Greek government's Ministries of Defense and Tourism in 1987. John F. Coates actively oversaw the accuracy of the construction, including the manner in which the hull shell was held together by 20,000 pinned mortise and tenon joints. In 1989, he was awarded an Honorary Degree (Doctor of Science) by the University of Bath. He also researched the archaeological remains of Bronze Age seagoing ships in Northern Europe, exploring their seaworthiness.

Personal life
Coates married Jane Waymouth in 1954, she predeceased him in 2008. He died on 10 July 2010, leaving two sons and five granddaughters. Coates' elder brother, chemist Geoffrey E. Coates, died in Laramie, Wyoming, in 2013.

References

1922 births
People educated at Clifton College
Alumni of The Queen's College, Oxford
British naval historians
2010 deaths
British naval architects
Royal Navy personnel of World War II
Officers of the Order of the British Empire
People from Swansea